Saša Stefanović (born 17 September 1975) is a Serbian former professional basketball player.

Professional career 
A point guard, Stefanović played for Profikolor, Beopetrol, Zemun, KK Zvezda Ruma, Radnički Jugopetrol, NIS Vojvodina, Crvena zvezda, BSG Ludwigsburg, Sloga, FMP, Türk Telekom, Iraklis, Bilbao, Igokea, Stal Ostrów Wielkopolski, Limoges CSP, Towzin Electric Kashan, Brotnjo, and Ulcinj.

On 6 January 2001, Stefanović was at the center of an altercation among players during a game in Antwerp, Belgium, between Stefanović's Zvezda and the home team Telindus Racing Antwerpen at the Top 16 game of the 2000–01 FIBA Saporta Cup. The brawl involved Stefanović and his teammates and Antwerpen's Stefan Sappenberghs and his teammates.

Career achievements
 ABA League champion: 1  (with FMP (Reflex): 2003–04)

References

Sources 
 Saša Stefanović: Mediteran je moj izbor

External links
 Sasa Stefanovic at eurobasket.com
 Sasa Stefanovic at aba-liga.com
 Sasa Stefanovic at proballers.com
 Sasa Stefanovic at fibaeurope.com
 Sasa Stefanovic at realgm.com
 Sasa Stefanovic at euroleague.net

1975 births
Living people
ABA League players
Basketball League of Serbia players
Basketball players from Belgrade
Bilbao Basket players
BKK Radnički players
Iraklis Thessaloniki B.C. players
Keravnos B.C. players
KK Beopetrol/Atlas Beograd players
KK Crvena zvezda players
KK FMP (1991–2011) players
KK Igokea players
KK Profikolor players
KK Sloga players
KK Vojvodina Srbijagas players
KK Zemun players
Liga ACB players
Limoges CSP players
Point guards
Riesen Ludwigsburg players
Serbian expatriate basketball people in Bosnia and Herzegovina
Serbian expatriate basketball people in Cyprus
Serbian expatriate basketball people in France
Serbian expatriate basketball people in Germany
Serbian expatriate basketball people in Greece
Serbian expatriate basketball people in Iran
Serbian expatriate basketball people in Montenegro
Serbian expatriate basketball people in Poland
Serbian expatriate basketball people in Spain
Serbian expatriate basketball people in Turkey
Serbian men's basketball players
Stal Ostrów Wielkopolski players
Türk Telekom B.K. players